Seoul Gwangjin FC is the South Korean futsal club based in Gwangjin-gu, Seoul. The club was founded in October 2009.

References

External links
 Facebook 

Futsal clubs in Seoul
Gwangjin District
Futsal clubs established in 2009
2009 establishments in South Korea